is a Japanese politician of the Liberal Democratic Party, a member of the House of Councillors in the Diet (national legislature). A native of Kumamoto Prefecture and graduate of the University of Tokyo, he worked at the Ministry of Home Affairs from 1958 to 1991. After teaching, he was elected to the House of Councillors for the first time in 1998.

References

External links 
 Official website in Japanese.

Members of the House of Councillors (Japan)
University of Tokyo alumni
Living people
1934 births
People from Kumamoto
Liberal Democratic Party (Japan) politicians